Hiltz Squared Media Group Inc. is a television and film production and distribution company based in Toronto, Ontario, Canada.

Television and film productions (past and present)
 Albert Fish (documentary)
 Fairy Tale (television)
 I Now Pronounce You... (television)
 Jack's House (film)
 Kanako (documentary)
 Panzram (documentary)
 The Perfect Life (documentary)
 Post No Bills (documentary)

External links
 Official Site

Television production companies of Canada
Film production companies of Canada
Companies based in Toronto